Crescent Rising is a program of the Reggie White Foundation, begun in May 2007, that offers free demolition services to homeowners in the metropolitan New Orleans area affected by Hurricane Katrina. The Crescent Rising program was created to expedite demolition through the encouragement of private sector involvement in order to speed the recovery of the community from hurricane damage. To qualify for assistance, affected homeowners are required to provide proof of identity and ownership. The foundation demolished its first home in June 2007.

References

External links and sources
NFL hall of famer still bringing down the house The Times-Picayune. June 2, 2007. Accessed August 7, 2007.

Companies based in New Orleans
Charities based in Louisiana
Social welfare charities based in the United States
Hurricane Katrina recovery in New Orleans